Panambih is metrical sung form of poetry, and a more modern version of the Tembang sunda of Indonesia.

External links
https://web.archive.org/web/20071112160455/http://www.chez.com/gamelan/cd940004.htm

References
http://www.answers.com/topic/music-of-indonesia
https://web.archive.org/web/20070223161247/http://www.musicbeats.net/indonesian_music.htm

Sundanese music